Weylan Harding (born 1972-01-05 in Houston, Texas) is the former head coach of the New York Dragons of the Arena Football League.

High school years
Harding attended Klein High School in Spring, Texas and was a student and a letterman in football. In football, he was an All-Conference selection and an All-Greater Houston selection. He attended Iowa State University, where he played defense on the school's football team. He majored in English.

Playing career
In his playing career, he was a defensive specialist for the Iowa Barnstormers (now the Dragons), the former Nashville Kats (now the Georgia Force), the now-defunct Portland Forest Dragons, and the Buffalo Destroyers (now the Columbus Destroyers). He retired as a player in 2000.

Coaching career
At the start of the 2005 season, Harding's first year leading the Dragons, he was 33 years old, making him the second youngest head coach in the history of the league. He had previously worked in the Buffalo Destroyers organization starting in 2000. After the Destroyers moved to Columbus, Ohio he became the team's defensive coordinator in 2002 and returned in 2004.

External links
New York Dragons' bio page
ArenaFan Online's Weylan Harding AFL coaching page

1972 births
Living people
People from Houston
People from Long Island
American football cornerbacks
Iowa State Cyclones football players
Iowa Barnstormers players
Nashville Kats players
Portland Forest Dragons players
Buffalo Destroyers players
New York Dragons coaches
Columbus Destroyers coaches